The 1980 Stock Car Brasil Championship was the second season of Stock Car Brasil that concluded with the first title of the 12 obtained by Ingo Hoffmann.

Drivers
All cars driven were the Chevrolet Opala.

Drivers' Championship

References

External links
  

Stock Car Brasil seasons
Stock Car Brasil season